Choi Myung-bin (Korean: 최명빈; born on 15 April 2008) is a South Korean child actress. She made her acting debut in 2016, since then, she has appeared in number of films and television series. She is best known for her roles in historical drama The King's Affection (2021) and weekend drama Young Lady and Gentleman (2021-2022) for which she won the Best Young Actress Award at 2021 KBS Drama Awards. She has acted in films also such as: The Vanished (2018) and Waiting for Rain (2021) among others.

Career
Choi Myung-bin is affiliated to artist management company Prain TPC.

In 2021 Choi played young female protagonist in KBS historical romance drama The King's Affection and was praised for her dual performance as Crown Prince Lee Hwi and court maid Dam-yi. The same year, she was cast in KBS2 weekend drama Young Lady and Gentleman as Lee Jae-ni - eldest daughter of male lead. Her performance in both dramas earned her  Best Young Actress award at 2021 KBS Drama Awards.

In 2022 she appeared in tvN coming-of-age romantic drama Twenty-Five Twenty-One as Kim Min-chae, the daughter of protagonist.

Filmography

Films

Television series

Web series

Musical shows

Awards and nominations

References

External links
 
 Choi Myung-bin on Daum 

Living people
2008 births
South Korean child actresses
21st-century South Korean actresses
South Korean film actresses
South Korean television actresses